The Seaside is the third demo album from English rock group Cardiacs. The album originally featured the second recording of what would become the band's only hit single, "Is This the Life?". It is the last of the band's releases to feature keyboard player/drummer/singer Mark Cawthra and the first to feature keyboard player William D. Drake (as well as being the only album to feature two other musicians who were briefly Cardiacs members - Graham Simmonds and Marguerite Johnson).

The album is composed of material the band had written and performed between 1980 and 1983. Initially The Seaside was only produced on cassette (as with earlier Cardiacs album releases), and was only made available through the band's fan club and at concerts. It is notable for having been the first formal release on the band's own label, the Alphabet Business Concern, and a showcases a much cleaner, fuller sound than their previous cassette tapes. Three editions of the cassette album were produced, each with a different cover - the first featuring a drawing of the “Little Man and a  [House” (as pictured above), the second a colour picture of bass player Jim Smith, and the third being a completely different picture in black-and-white. The three editions of the cassette album were released in 1983, 1984, and 1990, respectively. All versions are rare, with the 'Little Man and a House' cover being the rarest.

Several tracks on the cassette album were re-recorded for subsequent releases. "Is This the Life?", "A Little Man and a House" and "R.E.S." were all re-recorded and released five years later on Cardiacs' 1988 album A Little Man and a House and the Whole World Window. "Nurses Whispering Verses" was eventually re-recorded a decade later for the band's 1996 album Sing to God (albeit with different lyrics). Earlier recordings of "Nurses Whispering Verses" and "Is This the Life?" had previously appeared on the Toy World cassette.

The album captures the band in a transitional phase, with two distinct lineups of the band featured. Both featured Mark Cawthra (who moved between drums and keyboards during different recording sessions) and his voice is featured prominently on the album, occasionally sharing lead vocals with Tim Smith. Cawthra would leave the band amicably during the sessions for The Seaside in order to pursue his own projects.

Reissues

The Seaside was reissued on CD in 1995, with "Nurses Whispering Verses", "Is This the Life?", "A Little Man and a House" and "Dinner Time" all removed from the track listing. The reason provided for these omissions was that the master tape containing those four songs had been damaged and the recordings lost. Despite that, November 2015 saw the release of The Seaside: Original Edition box set which reinstated, and remastered, all the original tracks.

Track listing

All songs written and arranged by Tim Smith unless otherwise indicated.

Personnel
Tim Smith – guitar, vocals
Jim Smith – bass, vocals
Graham Simmonds – guitar
Sarah Smith – saxophone
Marguerite Johnston – alto saxophone
Dominic Luckman – drums (except 5, 10, 12)
Mark Cawthra – keyboards and vocals (except 5, 10, 12); drums (5, 10 12)
William D. Drake – keyboards (tracks 5, 10, 12)
Tim Quy – marimba, percussion
Lanze Lorrens – trumpet, backing vocals
Mike Peters – trumpet
Nick Pell – trumpet
Tim Hills – trombone
Wendy Collins – backing vocals

Seaside Treats 

Seaside Treats is a video and extended play (EP) consisting of three and four songs from The Seaside respectively. The video could be found in the very small number of "Seaside bags" sold at concerts which also contained the EP, the Cardiacs Book, a poster, a badge and a stick of Cardiacs seaside rock. The VHS, featuring alternative comedy sketches by the band, was released on 31 December 1984, and the 12-inch EP in 1985. A promo video for "A Little Man and a House" also appeared on the Jettisoundz compilation VHS Pirates of the Panasoniks.

Track listing
Side one
"A Little Man and a House" – 4:23
"Hope Day" – 6:36

Side two
"R.E.S." – 5:25
"To Go Off and Things" – 2:14 (Smith, Cawthra)

Video
 "A Little Man and a House"
 "R.E.S."
 "To Go Off and Things"

References

External links 
 Official Cardiacs site

Cardiacs albums
1984 albums